Several ships have been named Lion for the lion:

 was launched in the Netherlands in 1789. She was taken in prize c.1795. On her first voyage under British ownership she was under contract to the British East India Company (EIC). She was lost in 1798 on the homeward-bound leg of her voyage to India.
 was a Spanish vessel launched in 1802 that the British came to own in 1809. She was a merchantman and letter of marque. She captured the American privateer Matilda in a notable single-ship action in 1813. Lion was wrecked some months later.

See also
 – one of 18 ships of the Royal Navy
HM hired armed cutter Lion – one of two vessels of the Royal Navy

Ship names